Victor Krylov is a Russian-born British academic. He is emeritus professor of acoustics and vibration at Loughborough University.

Biography

Krylov was born in Tambov, Russia. He received his PhD in physics and mathematics (specialisation in acoustics) from the Moscow State University in 1981.  In 1989 he received his DSc in the same disciplines from the Moscow State University and the Higher Attestation Commission of the former USSR. He then pursued an academic career in various universities leading to his present position at Loughborough University.

Krylov has been awarded the Lenin Komsomol Prize in 1984 and the Rayleigh Medal in 2000.

Work

Krylov carried out research into Rayleigh waves, including their propagation at hypersonic frequencies, their propagation and scattering on curved and statistically rough surfaces. Further topics include acoustic emission from cracks developing in brittle solids, laser generation of sound in solids, localised vibrations propagating along edges of elastic wedges.

From 1993 Krylov worked in the UK, conducting research on ground vibrations generated by railway trains and by road vehicles. His prediction of ground vibration boom from high-speed trains travelling at speeds larger than Rayleigh wave velocity in the supporting ground has received public attention in connection with the proposed High Speed Rail system HS2 in the UK.

Krylov predicted the existence of localised elastic waves in immersed solid wedges and proposed to use them for wave-like aquatic propulsion of marine vessels. He suggests using electric motors or shape-memory materials to emulate  the propulsion of some fish, such as  stingrays, a process less efficient but quieter than conventional propellers. He also investigated the method of damping structural vibrations based on the "acoustic black hole effect" for flexural waves propagating in plates of variable local thickness.

Krylov has published several books and numerous papers on topics related to acoustics and vibration.

Books

Krasil'nikov, V.A. and Krylov, V.V. (1984),  Introduction to Physical Acoustics, Nauka, Moscow (in Russian).
Krasil'nikov, V.A. and Krylov, V.V. (1985),  Surface Acoustic Waves, Znanie, Moscow (in Russian). 
Krylov, V.V. (1989),  Basic Principles of Sound Radiation and Scattering, Moscow University Press, Moscow (in Russian).
Biryukov, S.V., Gulyaev, Y.V., Krylov, V.V. and Plessky, V.P. (1995), Surface Acoustic Waves in Inhomogeneous Media, Springer-Verlag, Berlin.
Krylov, V.V. (ed) (2001), Noise and Vibration from High Speed Trains, Thomas Telford, London.
Krylov, V.V. (ed) (2019), Ground Vibrations from High-Speed Railways: Prediction and Mitigation, ICE Publishing, London.

References

Living people
Academics of Loughborough University
Russian expatriates in England
Russian acoustical engineers
Moscow State University alumni
People from Tambov
Year of birth missing (living people)
Soviet physicists
20th-century Russian physicists